The Todd Mall is a mostly pedestrian mall in Alice Springs in the Northern Territory of Australia which serves as its "main street" and is one of the primary locations for shopping and leisure in the town. It contains many of the town's restaurants.

Fortnightly, from mid-March to early December, it also hosts the "Todd Mall Markets" as well as a number of "Night Markets" throughout the year. The Todd Mall is also the location of the Alice Springs Town Council's annual "Christmas Carnival" which features the lighting of the council's Christmas Tree on the Council Lawns.

History 

The Todd Mall is part of the first 104 lots of land released in the original township of Stuart which were released in 1888. From the very beginning the area now called Todd Mall, the northern section of what was then Todd Street, was considered the town's commercial centre; especially after the Stuart Arms Hotel was built (this is now the location of Alice Plaza).

Development 

Significant developments were made to the Todd Mall in the following years:

 1978; it was turned into a semi-mall; with one way traffic (and it was affectionately known as the Small)
 1987; it became a fully pedestrian mall
 2013; the far northern part of the Mall was opened again to cars in an effort to revitalise the mall

Buildings and tenants 

 Adelaide House Museum
 Alice Plaza (previously Ford Plaza)
 Alice Springs Cinema
 Alice Springs Visitor Information Centre
 Aurora Alice Springs (Hotel)
 Cafe Uccelo
 Epilogue Cafe and Lounge
 Jila Arts
 John Flynn Memorial Church
 Leaping Lizards Gallery
 Mbantua Fine Art Gallery
 Megafauna Central
 Mixed Lollies (Clothing)
 Outback Cycling
 Outbush
 Page 27 (Cafe)
 Piccolo's Cafe and Restaurant
 Red Dog Cafe
 Red Kangaroo Books
 Sporties Restaurant
 Talapi (Gallery)
 The Bakery, Alice Springs
 The Gem Gave (also the site of the first library in 1953)
 The Goods (Cafe)
 Todd Tavern

Former Tenants 

 Charlie Meyers Saddlery
 Eager Beavers (Grocery)
 Gum Tree Cafe
 Murray Neck
 Stuart Arms Hotel
 The Lane (Restaurant)
Uncle Edy's Ice Cream (closed 2020)
 Wallis Fogarty Store
 Windles Garage

See also
List of shopping centres in Australia

References

External links 
Alice Springs Town Council; Todd Mall Markets
Todd Mall Markets Incorporated; Todd Mall Markets
Travel Outback Australia; Shopping in Alice Springs

Busking venues
Buildings and structures in Alice Springs
Pedestrian malls in Australia
Shopping districts and streets in Australia
Tourist attractions in Alice Springs
Retail buildings in the Northern Territory